The Men's 2021 CIB Egyptian Open is the men's edition of the 2021 CIB Egyptian Open, which is a 2021–22 PSA World Tour event. The event will take place in Cairo, Egypt between 10 and 17 September, 2021. The event's main sponsor is the Commercial International Bank of Egypt.

Egypt's Ali Farag defeated fellow countryman Mohamed El Shorbagy in the final, winning the tournament for the second time.

Seeds

Draw and results

Semi-finals and final

Main Draw

Top half

Bottom half

See also
 2021 Women's Egyptian Squash Open

References

Men's Egyptian Open
Squash in Egypt
Egyptian Squash Open
Egyptian Squash Open